Oleysa Bakunova (born April 14, 1980 in Rahachow) is a Belarusian sprint canoer who competed in the early 2000s. At the 2000 Summer Olympics in Sydney, she finished sixth in the K-4 500 m event.

References
Sports-Reference.com profile

1980 births
People from Rahachow
Belarusian female canoeists
Canoeists at the 2000 Summer Olympics
Living people
Olympic canoeists of Belarus
Sportspeople from Gomel Region
21st-century Belarusian women